The Northwestern Electric Company – Alberta Substation, or simply Alberta Substation, is an historic building on the National Register of Historic Places in northeast Portland, Oregon's Concordia neighborhood, United States. The building houses Bar Cala, as of 2022.

See also
 National Register of Historic Places listings in Northeast Portland, Oregon

References

External links
 

		

Buildings and structures in Portland, Oregon
Concordia, Portland, Oregon
National Register of Historic Places in Portland, Oregon
Buildings and structures completed in 1931